Tammy is an American sitcom, starring Debbie Watson in the title role. Produced by Universal City Studios, 26 color half-hour episodes were aired on ABC from September 17, 1965, to March 11, 1966.

Tammy was loosely based on the three Tammy films; Tammy and the Bachelor (1957) starring Debbie Reynolds; Tammy Tell Me True (1961); and Tammy and the Doctor (1963) both starring Sandra Dee. The films themselves were adaptations of novels by Cid Ricketts Sumner. The series was also partially influenced by other rural-themed TV sitcoms such as The Beverly Hillbillies. In particular, there are similarities between Tammy's Cletus Tarleton and The Beverly Hillbillies Jethro Bodine.

Synopsis
The premise of the program revolves around Tammy Tarleton, an 18-year-old country girl who moves back and forth between her country family, which lives on a bayou houseboat, and the wealthy Brents, who own a plantation and pancake business. Tammy is hired as a secretary by a powerful industrialist with a handsome young son named Steven. Lavinia Tate, a high society neighbor wants her own daughter, Gloria, to marry Steven, so she repeatedly, but unsuccessfully, tries to smear Tammy’s reputation.

As with Gidget, there are many differences between the series and films that inspired it. In the films, Tammy's full name is Tambrey Tyree, shortened to Tammy. The name Tyree was changed to Tarleton. Also, Tammy Tyree had no family other than her grandfather, who was occasionally picked up by revenuers for fabricating "corn-likker".

Tammy lasted for one season (26 episodes), and was cancelled in 1966.

Main castTammy Tarleton — Debbie WatsonGrandpa Mordechai Tarleton — Denver PyleUncle Lucius — Frank McGrathJohn Brent — Donald WoodsSteven Brent — Jay SheffieldDwayne Whitt — George FurthCousin Cletus Tarleton — Dennis RobertsonLavinia Tate — Dorothy GreenGloria Tate — Linda MarshallPeter Tate — David MacklinMrs. Brent''' — Doris Packer

Episodes

Tammy and the Millionaire
In 1967, Universal Pictures released a cinema movie called Tammy and the Millionaire  which included all the main TV cast (except Cletus Tarleton) and was, in fact,  a re-edit from four half-hour 1965 Tammy TV episodes.

International airingsTammy was originally broadcast in several countries, including Japan, Germany, and Australia. The Tammy'' series was especially popular in Germany.

References

External links

1965 American television series debuts
1966 American television series endings
1960s American sitcoms
American Broadcasting Company original programming
English-language television shows
Television series by Universal Television